The Ibero-American Summit, formally the Ibero-American Conference of Heads of State and Governments, is a yearly meeting of the heads of government and state of the Spanish- and Portuguese-speaking nations of Europe and the Americas, as members of the Organization of Ibero-American States. The permanent secretariat in preparation of the summits is the Ibero-American General Secretariat (SEGIB).

Member states
The first summit, held in 1991 in Guadalajara, Mexico, was attended by the governments of Argentina, Bolivia, Brazil, Chile, Colombia, Costa Rica, Cuba, the Dominican Republic, Ecuador, El Salvador, Guatemala, Honduras, Mexico, Nicaragua, Panama, Paraguay, Peru, Portugal, Spain, Uruguay and Venezuela. Andorra joined in 2004. Equatorial Guinea and the Philippines entered in 2009 as "associate members". Puerto Rico has participated sometimes as an associate member, but as it is not a sovereign country it is not allowed to completely join the summits. Belize and East Timor have expressed their interest in joining the summits, although they have not been allowed to join for the moment. All these countries were either Spanish or Portuguese colonies (Belize and the Philippines were Spanish before belonging to the United Kingdom and the United States, respectively). Other former Spanish and Portuguese colonies may join the summits in the future.

Expansion
  Angola
  Antigua and Barbuda
  Bahamas
  Barbados
  Belize
  Cape Verde
  East Timor
  Equatorial Guinea
  Guinea-Bissau
  Grenada
  São Tomé and Príncipe
  Saint Lucia
  Saint Vincent and the Grenadines
  Saint Kitts and Nevis
  Sahrawi Arab Democratic Republic
  Trinidad and Tobago

Summits

See also 
 Ibero-America
 Organization of Ibero-American States
 Community of Portuguese Language Countries
 Latin American integration
 Rio Group
 ¿Por qué no te callas?

References

Bibliography
 (1992) Primera Cumbre Iberoamericana, Guadalajara, México, 1991: Discursos, Declaración de Guadalajara y documentos. Mexico: Fondo de Cultura Económica.

External links

  Cumbres Iberoamericanas de Jefes de Estado y de Gobierno
  Ibero-America's Secretariat General Official Web-site (SEGIB)
 Organization of Ibero-American States (OEI) website in Spanish in Portuguese
  Official Web-site for the Organization of Ibero-American Youth (OIJ)
  Web site for 2008 Iberoamerican Summit in El Salvador

Foreign relations of Brazil
Foreign relations of Portugal
Lusophone culture
Intergovernmental organizations
Former Spanish colonies
20th-century diplomatic conferences
21st-century diplomatic conferences
1991 in international relations
Hispanidad
Ibero-America